is an anime television series. The episodes are directed by Katsushi Sakurabi, animated by J.C.Staff, and produced by the Tsukihime Production Committee, which included Geneon Entertainment, Movic, Tokyo Broadcasting System, and J.C.Staff. The English adaptation of the episodes has been licensed by Geneon Entertainment. The episodes are based on the visual novel Tsukihime by Type-Moon and adapt the source material over twelve episodes. The plot of the episodes follows Shiki Tohno after he moves into his sister's house, and his interactions with the vampire Arcueid Brunestud.

The episodes aired in Japan from October 10, 2003 to December 26, 2003 on BS-i and Tokyo Broadcasting System. The episodes received their international premiere on the anime television network Animax, who have also later broadcast the series across its respective networks worldwide in Southeast Asia and South Asia, and its other networks in East Asia, South America and other regions under the title Lunar Legend Tsukihime.

Two pieces of theme music are used for the episodes; one opening theme and one ending theme.

Six DVD compilations, each containing two episodes, have been released by Geneon Entertainment in Japan. The first was released on December 10, 2003, and the sixth on May 13, 2004. Geneon Entertainment has released three DVD compilations, each containing four episodes, in North America, with the third released on February 22, 2005.

Episode list

See also

Tsukihime

References

External links
Official J.C. Staff website  

Episodes
Tsukihime, Lunar Legend